Meenakshisundaram Kalyanasundaram (20 October 1909 – 27 July 1988) was an Indian politician and former Member of the Legislative Assembly of Tamil Nadu. He was elected to the Tamil Nadu legislative assembly as a Communist Party of India candidate from Tiruchirappalli - II constituency in 1952, 1957 and 1962 elections. Kalyanasundaram also served as a member of the Lok sabha for two periods 1971 to 1976 and 1977 to 1980 and upper house of India's Parliament the Rajya Sabha from 1980 to 1986. Kalyanasundaram married K. Logambal.

References 

Communist Party of India politicians from Tamil Nadu
1909 births
1988 deaths
India MPs 1971–1977
India MPs 1977–1979
Lok Sabha members from Tamil Nadu
People from Karur district
People from Tiruchirappalli district
Madras MLAs 1952–1957
Madras MLAs 1957–1962